Hutian Town is a rural town in Xiangxiang, Hunan, China.

Administrative division
The town is divided into 52 villages and two communities, the following areas: Hutian Community, Beifengpu Community, Huzhong Village, Xiaoshui Village, Daping Village, Rixin Village, Shutang Village, Shishi Village, Hutian Village, Longdang Village, Tongsheng Village, Zhongshi Village, Shichun Village, Yanjiang Village, Xinpo Village, Guanghui Village, Guangsheng Village, Xiangxi Village, Xiashankou Village, Zhidong Village, Hengdong Village, Hedong Village, Dajin Village, Nanyue Village, Tanxi Village, Shangxinqiao Village, Shigu Village, Duizi Village, Xiamu Village, Ma'anshi Village, Tanqiao Village, Shuangping Village, Paizishi Village, Shanchong Village, Dongduan Village, Shiyan Village, Shanping Village, Wuyi Village, Tuotangwan Village, Datang Village, Jianshan Village, Outang Village, Shiping Village, Chongxi Village, Xinpuzi Village, Xionghui Village, Jinquan Village, Jinqiao Village, Jingwan Village, Yanqian Village, Yanlong Village, and Hongfeng Village.

Geography

Hedong Reservoir is a reservoir and the largest water body in the town.

Transportation

Expressway
The Changsha-Shaoshan-Loudi Expressway, which runs east through Fanjiang Town, Jinsou Township, Huitang Town, Jinshi Town, Donghutang Town, Huaminglou Town and Daolin Town to Yuelu District, Changsha, and the west to Louxing District, Loudi.

Provincial Highway
The Provincial Highway S209 runs south–north through the town.

Railway
The Luoyang–Zhanjiang Railway, from Luoyang City, Henan Province to Zhanjiang City, Guangdong Province, through Qingshanqiao Town at Qingshanqiao Railway Station.

Notable people
 Zhou Qunfei, entrepreneur.

Gallery

References

External links

Divisions of Xiangxiang